Tacnis or Taknis, Tècnis, also  is a small town in Jebel Akhdar  region in north eastern Cyrenaica, Libya. It is on the inner road between Marj and Lamluda. There is a minor road connecting the town to the north with Libyan Coastal Highway. There also an indirect road connecting it with Charruba to the south.

It is the birthplace of Hussein Maziq, a Libyan politician and former prime minister of Libya in 1918.

See also 
 List of cities in Libya

Notes

Populated places in Marj District
Cyrenaica